Avramovka is a rural locality (a selo) in Boldyrevsky Selsoviet of Zavitinsky District, Amur Oblast, Russia. The population was 34 as of 2018. There are 4 streets.

Geography 
Avramovka is located on the left bank of the Zavitaya River, 27 km north of Zavitinsk (the district's administrative centre) by road. Boldyrevka is the nearest rural locality.

References 

Rural localities in Zavitinsky District